Nikolay Gogol (5 January 1948 – 1997) was a Soviet sprint canoer who competed in the early to mid-1970s. He won five medals at the ICF Canoe Sprint World Championships with three golds (K-1 500 m: 1971, K-1 4 x 500 m: 1970, K-2 500 m: 1973), a silver (K-4 1000 m: 1973), and a bronze (K-2 500 m: 1971).

References

Mention of Nikolay Gogol's death 

1948 births
1997 deaths
Soviet male canoeists
Russian male canoeists
ICF Canoe Sprint World Championships medalists in kayak